Wintersleep is a Canadian indie rock band formed in Halifax, Nova Scotia in 2001. The band's original lineup consisted of vocalist and guitarist Paul Murphy, guitarist and keyboardist Tim d'Eon, and drummer Loel Campbell. In 2002, Jud Haynes joined the band as bass guitarist until 2007. In 2005, Mike Bigelow joined on keyboards until 2006, after which he played bass, until 2016. Since 2006, Jon Samuel has served as a backing vocalist, keyboardist, and guitarist, while Chris Bell has served as a backing vocalist and bass guitarist since 2016. Bigelow returned to the band in 2021. In 2005, Wintersleep opened for Pearl Jam for two shows in St. John's, Newfoundland at the Mile One Stadium. The band received a Juno Award in 2008. To date, Wintersleep have released seven studio albums.

History

First three albums: 2001–07
Wintersleep formed in 2001. Originally from the small town of Yarmouth, Nova Scotia, members Paul Murphy and Tim d'Eon had known each other through their previous progressive rock band, Kary, which they formed in the mid-1990s, while still in high school, with drummer Mark d'Eon and bassist Jesse Luke. Kary released two official albums, The Sound of Beauty Breathing in 2001 and Light in 2004, before disbanding. Murphy was friends with drummer Loel Campbell, a native of Stellarton, with whom he recorded a number of songs. Tim d'Eon and bassist Jud Haynes soon joined them, and they named themselves Wintersleep. They released two albums through Dependent Music, a label and artist collective formed in Yarmouth, Nova Scotia in 1994.

In 2006, Wintersleep signed with Labwork Music, a partnership label of Sonic Unyon and EMI Music Canada, and re-released their first two studio albums. The re-releases included bonus tracks and videos not featured in the originals.

On October 2, 2007, Wintersleep released their third full-length album, Welcome to the Night Sky. A limited edition of the record, on vinyl, with alternative artwork, was published by Hand Drawn Dracula. They won the 2008 Juno Award for New Group of the Year.

New albums, increased exposure: 2009–14
Wintersleep was selected as one of the opening acts by Paul McCartney for his concert at Halifax Common on July 11, 2009. That year, the band toured in support of Welcome to the Night Sky and also began writing their next record, New Inheritors, which came out on May 17 in Europe and May 18 in North America. Their fifth album, Hello Hum, was published in 2012.

The group's song "Weighty Ghost" was used in the 2008 film One Week, in both the trailer and one of the final scenes. In 2010, the song was included in The Top 100 Canadian Singles by National Posts Bob Mersereau. Wintersleep performed "Weighty Ghost" on the Late Show with David Letterman on January 14, 2011. In 2011, the song appeared on the TV series Being Human and was also used in the background of a Molson Canadian commercial, advertising the "Red Leaf Project". In 2013, "Weighty Ghost" became the theme music of the Canadian Broadcasting Corporation television crime drama Cracked.

Wintersleep toured extensively during 2013, including as the opening act for Scottish indie band Frightened Rabbit, who invited them on their UK tour and later their North American tour. Wintersleep also opened for Frightened Rabbit on the latter's North American dates in early 2018.

In 2014, the band recorded eleven tracks at The Sonic Temple studio in Halifax. That year, they also performed on a moving streetcar at the North by Northeast festival in Toronto.

New label and further releases: 2015–present
In December 2015, Wintersleep signed with Dine Alone Records. In January 2016, they premiered the song "Amerika" through The Wall Street Journals blog. On March 4 of that year, the band released their sixth studio album, The Great Detachment, through Dine Alone."Album of the week: Wintersleep The Great Detachment". Now Toronto, by Vish Khanna. March 2, 2016"Wintersleep out of hibernation". Ottawa Citizen, Lynn Saxberg. March 1, 2016 Rush bassist and vocalist, Geddy Lee, played on the track "Territory".

On Valentine's Day 2018, Wintersleep announced that their first three albums would be reissued on vinyl, with a bonus 7" single including previously unreleased tracks.

In December 2018, the band announced their next album, In the Land Of. It was released on March 29, 2019, by Dine Alone. The album release was supported by a national tour, from March 20 to May 3, 2019, with some but not all dates featuring Partner as the opening act. Wintersleep was joined by Montreal band Caveboy as the opening act at four Ontario tour dates. In the Land Of went on to be long-listed for the Polaris Music Prize.

In September 2019, Wintersleep embarked on a tour of Europe, following the worldwide digital release of "Free Fall" and "Fading Out", on September 9, 2019. The two singles were originally released on Record Store Day and became the top-selling release of the national event.

Other projects
The band's members frequently collaborate outside of Wintersleep. Murphy and d'Eon played together in the band Kary. Drummer Campbell also performed with Kary and is a member of several other projects, including Contrived, Holy Fuck, Hayden, Chikita Violenta, Land of Talk, The Holy Shroud, and The Remains of Brian Borcherdt. Murphy collaborated with various other musicians, including his brother, on his solo project Postdata. Let's Be Wilderness, the 2018 album by Postdata, features Campbell and d'Eon. Bigelow plays bass in Contrived with Campbell and also performs with Holy Fuck and The Holy Shroud. d'Eon played guitar for Contrived before Samuel joined the group, appearing on Contrived's first record, Pursuit of Plots, and the second album, Dead Air Verbatim. Samuel was a member of Halifax band Slight Return.

Band membersCurrent Loel Campbell – drums, guitar (2001–present)
 Paul Murphy – vocals, guitar (2001–present)
 Tim d'Eon – guitar, keyboards (2001–present)
 Jon Samuel – keyboards, backing vocals, guitar (2006–present)
 Mike Bigelow – bass guitar (2007–2016, 2021–present), keyboards (2005–2006)Past'''
 Jud Haynes – bass guitar (2002–2007)
 Chris Bell – bass guitar, backing vocals (2016–2020)

Discography
Studio albums

Singles

Videography

Awards
 2008: Juno Award for New Group of the Year
 2008: Much Music Video Award – VideoFACT Award for "Weighty Ghost"

References

External links
 
 Labwork Music record label
 2012 Off-stage video recording session with They Shoot Music Don't They''

Musical groups established in 2001
Musical groups from Halifax, Nova Scotia
Canadian indie rock groups
Juno Award for Breakthrough Group of the Year winners
Sonic Unyon artists